Pimelea sylvestris is a species of shrub in the family Thymelaeaceae. It is native to Western Australia.

Description
The shrub grows erect. It grows from 0.3 to 2.0 m tall, with white and pink flowers that flower from August to December. It can be found on coastal limestone, lateritic ridges, granite rocks, and swampy areas.

References

sylvestris
Malvales of Australia